Osmanthus fragrans (lit.

In China, it is the "city flower" of the cities of Hangzhou, Zhejiang; Suzhou, Jiangsu; and Guilin, Guangxi. In Japan, it is the "city tree" of Kitanagoya, Aichi Prefecture and Beppu, Ōita Prefecture, and the "town tree" of Yoshitomi, Fukuoka, Fukuoka Prefecture.

Growth

Cultivation

It is cultivated as an ornamental plant in East Asian gardens, and gardens in Europe, North America, and elsewhere in the world for its deliciously fragrant flowers which carry the scent of ripe peaches or apricots. A number of cultivars have been selected for garden use, with varying flower colors, such as Osmanthus fragrans 'Yanhua' with its variegated foliage and orange blooms. Within Japan, the white- and orange-blossoming subspecies are distinguished as ginmokusei (lit. "silver osmanthus") and kinmokusei (lit. "gold osmanthus"), respectively.

Uses

Culinary

In Chinese cuisine, its flowers may be infused with green or black tea leaves to create osmanthus tea (桂花茶, guìhuāchá). The flowers are also used to produce osmanthus-scented jam (guìhuājiàng), osmanthus cakes (guìhuāgāo), dumplings, soups, and osmanthus liquor (guìhuājiǔ). Osmanthus jam is used as an ingredient in a type of gruel called chátāng, which is made from sorghum or millet flour and sugar mixed with boiling water.  This dish is associated with the northern city of Tianjin, although it may also be found in Beijing.

Osmanthus is also used for making many traditional Chinese desserts, such as osmanthus tangyuan with rice wine syrup (桂花酒釀湯圓).

Repellent
In some regions of North India, especially in the state of Uttarakhand, the flowers of sweet osmanthus are used to protect clothes from insects.

Medicinal
In traditional Chinese medicine, osmanthus tea has been used as an herbal tea for the treatment of irregular menstruation. The extract of dried flowers showed neuroprotective, free-radical scavenging, antioxidative effects in in vitro assays.

Cultural associations 
From the occasion of its blossoming, the sweet osmanthus is closely associated with the Chinese Mid-Autumn Festival. Osmanthus wine is a traditional choice for the "reunion wine" drunk with one's family, and osmanthus-flavored confections and teas may also be consumed. Chinese mythology held that a sweet osmanthus grows on the moon and was endlessly cut by Wu Gang: some versions held that he was forced to cut it every 1000 years lest its luxuriant growth overshadow the moon itself, others that he was obliged to cut it constantly only to see it regrow an equal amount every day.

In late imperial China, the osmanthus was also associated with the imperial examinations, which were held in the 8th lunar month. The chengyu "pluck osmanthus in the Toad Palace" (Chángōng zhé guì) was a refined paraphrase for "passing the exam", in part since one would attract hangers-on as if he smelled as sweet as osmanthus thereafter. "Breaking the osmanthus twig and mounting the dragon" was another euphemism, in this case, for sex.

Notes

References

External links 

 line drawing of  Osmanthus fragrans, Manual of Vascular Plants of the Lower Yangtze Valley China Illustration fig. 296 

fragrans
Flora of Guizhou
Flora of Sichuan
Flora of Yunnan
Flora of Taiwan
Flora of Japan
Flora of Assam (region)
Flora of Bhutan
Flora of Indo-China
Plants described in 1790
Medicinal plants
Plants used in traditional Chinese medicine
Trees of Nepal